DF King Worldwide is an international agency holding company with focus on financial communications and stakeholder management. It was founded in 2007 by Oliver Niedermaier, and Enzo Villani,  as Sage Holdings and rebranded as DF King Worldwide in November 2009. King Worldwide has a staff of over 900 and offices in New York City, Boston, London, Stockholm, Dubai, Hong Kong, Moscow, Madrid, Cape Town and Sao Paulo.
DF King Worldwide is backed by The Riverside Company. Niedermaier served as President and CEO from 2008 to 2012. Currently the Chief executive officer and president is Terry Thompson.

Subsidiary agencies 

 D. F. King & Co.
 M:Communications
 Capital Precision
 Broadgate Consultants
 Donlin, Recano & Co.
 Keyhaven
 KWD

Recognition 

DF King Worldwide was selected on November 23, 2009 to join the World Economic Forum's Community of Global Growth Companies, "a group of more than 200 rapidly growing multinational companies that are reshaping the global economic landscape."

External links 
 Official web site of DF King Worldwide
 http://www.prnewswire.com/news-releases/taylor-rafferty-management-acquires-assets-from-df-king-worldwide-252645791.html

References 

Public relations companies of the United States